Dan Glimne (born 1947), whose full name is Dan Ejde Gustaf Glimne, is a Swedish games expert, game designer and "famous poker player" who is "very interested in traditional games".

Life 
Glimne was born on 27 April 1947. After studying at Lund University of Technology, Glimne became the product development manager at Alga in 1980–1989 and subsequently worked as his own entrepreneur and consultant. He has edited and constructed a very large number of games, and has periodically been Sweden's only professional game designer. He has also written several books about games, participated as a game expert in encyclopaedias, such as Bra Böckers Lexikon (Good Books Lexicon), the  Nationalencyklopedin (Swedish National Encyclopedia) and Myggans nöjeslexikon (Myggan's Entertainment Lexicon), and commented on poker on television. His game, Ostindiska Kompaniet was Swedish game of the year in 1992.

Glimne has also been politically active and is a candidate for the Moderate Party in the Swedish Parliament. He has been married since 2001 to Ingrid Jerneborg Glimne, local politician for the Moderates in Gnesta municipality. Together they reside in Gnesta.

Designed games (selection)

Board games 
Batavia
Binary Dice
Drakborgen (with Jakob Bonds)
Drakborgen II
DungeonQuest
Emil i Lönneberga - Ett hyss-spel från Alga
Fantomen
Goliat - En festlig helsvensk figur på äventyr i stenåldern!
Geni 2000
Gibberish
Joakim von Ankas fantastiska affärer
Jorden runt på 80 dagar
Knorr (reklamspel för livsmedel)
Kurt Olsson
Mika (the game from the TV series)
MasterQuiz
Microchess
Ostindiska kompaniet
Personality
SportQuiz
Stadens nyckel (published by Casper)
Svea Rike
Svea Rike Batalj - Expansion #1
Sätt sprätt på en miljon
Stoppa pressarna
Travspelet
Årets spel

Card games 
Valkampanj - a game of perfect information for 3-6 players
Ben Johnsons dopingspel
Nasdaq
Skattepolitik
Korruption
Fibonacci-regering
Auktionsrummy
Blindwhist

Books (selection)
 Nya spel (B. Wahlströms, 1994)
 Pokerhandboken (B. Wahlströms, 1995), 2nd edn. 2002, 3rd edn. 2005
 Kortspelshandboken (B. Wahlströms, 1996), 
 Pirayaklubbens handbok (Tago Förlag, 1997)
 Spel med knappar (BonnierCarlsen, 1998)
 Trixa med knappar (BonnierCarlsen, 1998)
 100 kortspel & trick (Frida Förlag, 1998), 
 Världens största svindlare (Frida Förlag, 2002)
 Kasinohandboken
 Hur man kör miniracing (Allt om hobby AB, 1968-01),

References

Biographical source 
 "Medarbetare i Myggans Nöjeslexikon" i Myggans Nöjeslexikon, Vol. 9 (Höganäs 1991), page 255.

External links
Interview with Dan Glimne

1947 births
Swedish poker players
Board game designers
Moderate Party politicians
Swedish non-fiction writers
Card game book writers
Living people